Edwin Lorimer Thomas is the Ernest Dell Butcher Professor of Engineering at Rice University and served as the William and Stephanie Sick Dean of the George R. Brown School of Engineering from 2011-2017. Thomas earned a B.S. in mechanical engineering from the University of Massachusetts Amherst in 1963 and a Ph.D. in materials science and engineering from Cornell University in 1974. Thomas was awarded the status of Fellow in the American Physical Society, after they were nominated by their Division of Polymer Physics in 1985, for being a leading authority on the application of electron microscopy and scattering techniques to problems in polymer structure-property relations and for contributions on mosaic block structure of semicrystalline polymers as well as on the structure of the noncrystalline solid state of glassy polymers.

References 

Fellows of the American Physical Society
American physicists
Minnesota CEMS